Markle House may refer to:

Dixon–Markle House, Aspen, Colorado
Markle House and Mill Site, Otter Creek Township, Indiana
George and Eugene Markle House, Petoskey, Michigan
Jacob F. Markle Stone House, Rochester, New York
Markle–Pittock House, Portland, Oregon